The Eupithecia acutula is a moth in the family Geometridae. It can be found in Libya.

References

Moths described in 1936
acutula
Moths of Africa